Kusawa Lake is a lake in the southern Yukon, Canada. Kusawa means "long narrow lake" in the Tlingit language. The Kusawa Lake is a lake in Canada's Yukon Territory. It is fed by the Primrose River and Kusawa River. The Takhini outflows to the Yukon River from the northern tip of Kusawa Lake. It is a common tourist destination and is also popular for fishing.

Description
Kusawa Lake is one of many large, long and narrow glacier-fed alpine lakes in the southern Yukon, most of which are part of the Yukon River system. Others include Teslin Lake, Atlin Lake, Tagish Lake, Marsh Lake, Lake Laberge, and Kluane Lake.

Etymology
Kusawa was derived from a Tlingit phrase, which means narrow lake. Because retreating glaciers often leave long and narrow lakes, there were at least four lakes which were once called Kusawa, including the present-day Kusawa Lake.

Archaeology
The Yukon Ice Patches are studied by archaeologists in partnership with six Yukon First Nations, on whose traditional territory the ice patches were found. They include the Carcross/Tagish First Nation, the Kwanlin Dün First Nation, the Ta’an Kwäch’än Council, the Champagne and Aishihik First Nations, the Kluane First Nation, and the Teslin Tlingit Council. The wooden dart shaft fragment that was recovered was radiocarbon dated to 4360 ± 50 14C yr BP (TO 6870).

Kusawa Lake Territorial Park

Wildlife

Fish
The lake is dominated by Arctic grayling, herring, round whitefish, and American char.

Caribou
There are no longer any caribou in the region but in her 1987 interviews, Elder Mary Ned (born 1890s-) also spoke about caribou being "all over this place." Evidence of this was proven by the nearby discovery of the Ice Patch artifacts...Oral history tells us that a corral, or caribou fence was located on the east side of the lake, between the lake and the mountain."

See also
 List of lakes in Yukon

References

 National Resources Canada

Lakes of Yukon